Skjerstad is a former municipality in Nordland county, Norway.  The  municipality existed from 1838 until its dissolution in 2005.  The municipality generally encompassed the area around the Misværfjorden in what is now Bodø Municipality, although it originally was much larger, also including the entire present-day Fauske Municipality.  The administrative centre of Skjerstad municipality was the village of Misvær.

History
The municipality of Skjerstad was established on 1 January 1838 (see formannskapsdistrikt).  On 1 January 1905, most of Skjerstad Municipality located on the north side of the Skjerstadfjorden (population: 4,646) was separated to form the new Fauske Municipality.  In 1949, a small district of Skjerstad (population: 10) was transferred to neighboring Saltdal Municipality.  During the 1960s, there were many municipal mergers across Norway due to the work of the Schei Committee. On 1 January 1963, the small area of Skjerstad on the north side of the fjord (population: 224) was transferred to neighboring Bodin Municipality.  On 1 January 2005, the municipality of Skjerstad was merged with Bodø Municipality to form a new, larger Bodø Municipality.  Just prior to the merger (in 2002), the population of Skjerstad was 1,080.

Name
The municipality (originally the parish) is named after the old Skjerstad farm since the first Skjerstad Church was built there. The first element possibly comes from the old name for the local river  which means "pure" or "clear".

Coat of arms
The coat of arms was granted on 14 July 1991 and they were in use until 1 January 2005 when the municipality was dissolved. The official blazon is "Vert, a millstone argent". This means the arms have a green field (background) and the charge is a millstone or grinding stone. The millstone has a tincture of argent which means it is commonly colored white, but if it is made out of metal, then silver is used. The millstone was chosen to symbolize all the large and small mills that existed in Skjerstad in the past. The arms were designed by Arvid Sveen.

Government
While it existed, this municipality was responsible for primary education (through 10th grade), outpatient health services, senior citizen services, unemployment, social services, zoning, economic development, and municipal roads. During its existence, this municipality was governed by a municipal council of elected representatives, which in turn elected a mayor.

Mayors
The mayors of Skjerstad:

 1838-1842: Johan Fredrik Lampe
 1842-1844: Carl Berg 
 1844-1848: Nils Jønsberg
 1848-1851: Carl Berg 
 1851-1852: Johan Normann
 1852-1856: Nils Jønsberg
 1856-1856: Johan P. Schjelderup 
 1856-1860: Marcus Randers
 1861-1862: Bernhard Koch
 1863-1866: Wilhelm Sandberg 
 1867-1868: Bernhard Koch
 1869-1870: Christian Evjenth
 1871-1872: Bernhard Koch
 1873-1874: Jens Johannesen
 1875-1878: Ulrik Neumann 
 1879-1880: Hans Hansen
 1881-1886: Bernhard Koch
 1887-1892: Johan Jørgensen
 1893-1901: Olaf Amundsen 
 1901-1904: Johan Jørgensen
 1905-1913: Johan Olsen 
 1914-1931: Sofus Thoresen 
 1932-1934: Ivar Sjaastad 
 1935-1941: Isak Naurstad 
 1941-1945: Thoralf Thoresen 
 1945-1951: Isak Naurstad
 1952-1955: Julius Breivik
 1955-1959: Sigurd Sandåker 
 1960-1963: Karsten Thoresen (Ap)
 1964-1967: Otto Moeng (Sp)
 1968-1971: Harald Dankertsen 
 1972-1975: Karsten Thoresen (Ap)
 1976-1979: Aasmund Brekke (Sp)
 1980-1984: Otto Moeng (Sp)
 1984-1996: Fredrik Støvset (Ap)
 1996-2003: Sven-Åke Hagen (Sp)
 2003-2005: Sissel Jakobsen (SV)

Municipal council
The municipal council  of Skjerstad was made up of representatives that were elected to four year terms.  The party breakdown of the final municipal council was as follows:

See also
List of former municipalities of Norway

References

Bodø
Former municipalities of Norway
1838 establishments in Norway
2005 disestablishments in Norway